Sose Tanda Soubhagya (aka Sose Thanda Saubhagya) (Kannada: ಸೊಸೆ ತಂದ ಸೌಭಾಗ್ಯ) is a 1977 Kannada film written by P. B. Duttaragi, directed by A. V. Sheshagiri Rao, starring Vishnuvardhan and Manjula.
It is the first CinemaScope movie made in  Kannada.

Plot
This is the story of two women who become the daughters-in-law of the same family. One of them is determined to divide the family and the other wishes to unite them.

Cast

 Vishnuvardhan as Shekar 
 Manjula as Geetha
 Rajesh as Ravi
 Vijaya Lalitha as Nagaveni (Voice dubbed by B. Jayashree)
 Vajramuni as Karigowda
 Balakrishna 
 K. S. Ashwath as Ramappa
 Dwarakish as Dathatreya (Dathu)
 Uma Shivakumar as Parvathamma
 Jayashree
 Rekha
 Naveena
 Prema
 Ramachandra Naidu
 Jyothishree
 Chandrashekar as Shankar
 Kalavathi
 VanajasShree
 Dinesh in Guest Appearance

Soundtrack
Soundtrack was composed by G. K. Venkatesh. The song "Ravi Varmana" became a cult classic. Venkatesh later reused this tune in Telugu as "Ravivarmake Andani" for Ravanude Ramudayithe? and in Tamil as "Neraagave" for Nenjil Oru Mull. The song was later remixed in Buddhivanta (2008).
 "Saaku Ennuvane" singer: SPB, lyrics: Vijayanarasimha
 "Atthige Thangi Ninna Aata" singers: SPB, S. Janaki, lyrics: Chi Udayashankar
 "Ravivarmana Kunchada Kale" singers: P. B. Sreenivas, S. Janaki, lyrics: R. N. Jayagopal
 "O Henne Nillu Nillu" singer: SPB, lyrics: Chi Udayashankar
 "Eke Avasaravu Helu" singer: S. Janaki, lyrics Chi Udayashankar
 "Dhesha Dheshadolage" singers: SPB, S. Janaki, lyrics: Vijayanarasimha

References

External links
 Sose Thanda Saubhagya at the Internet Movie Database

1977 films
1970s Kannada-language films
Films scored by G. K. Venkatesh
Films directed by A. V. Seshagiri Rao